The Arcata Transit Center is a bus station in Arcata, California.  It is located at 925 E Street, between 9th and 10th Streets.

The center is served by six fixed-route local and inter-city transit services.  Arcata and Mad River Transit System offers service around Arcata, Redwood Transit System provides service between Arcata and neighboring towns in Humboldt County, Redwood Coast Transit offers service to Crescent City, California, and Blue Lake Rancheria Transit System offers service between Arcata and Blue Lake, California.   Amtrak Thruway Motorcoaches stop at the center on their way from the San Joaquins and Capitol Corridor trains at Martinez to the Arcata-Eureka Airport in McKinleyville.  The Arcata station's Amtrak code is (ARC).  Arcata Transit Center is also the northern terminus for Greyhound Lines once daily route to/from San Francisco.

External links
 Redwood Transit System stop times at Arcata Transit Center
 Arcata at Amtrak California
 

Arcata, California
Bus stations in Humboldt County, California
Amtrak Thruway Motorcoach stations in California